High Infidelity is a 1964 Italian comedy film directed by Mario Monicelli, Elio Petri, Franco Rossi and Luciano Salce.

Cast
"Scandaloso" segment
 Nino Manfredi as Francesco
 Fulvia Franco as Raffaella
 John Phillip Law as Ronald
 Eleanor Beacour
 Vittorio La Paglia
 Luigi Zerbinati
"Peccato nel Pomeriggio" segment
 Charles Aznavour as Giulio
 Claire Bloom as Laura
"La Sospirosa" segment
 Monica Vitti as Gloria
 Jean-Pierre Cassel as Tonino
 Sergio Fantoni as Luigi
"Gente Moderna" segment
 Ugo Tognazzi as Cesare
 Michèle Mercier as Clara
 Bernard Blier as Sergio

References

External links

1964 films
1964 comedy films
Adultery in films
1960s Italian-language films
Italian anthology films
Italian comedy films
Italian black-and-white films
Films directed by Mario Monicelli
Films directed by Elio Petri
Films directed by Franco Rossi
Films directed by Luciano Salce
Films with screenplays by Ruggero Maccari
1960s Italian films